Miguel Alemán may refer to:
Miguel Alemán González (1884–1929), general in the Mexican Revolution; father of:
Miguel Alemán Valdés (1900–1983), president of  Mexico from 1946 to 1952; father of:
Miguel Alemán Velasco (born 1932), governor of Veracruz from 1998 to 2004; father of:
Miguel Alemán Magnani, owner of low-cost airline Interjet

Named for them 

Estadio Miguel Aleman, sports stadium in Celaya, Guanajuato
Miguel Alemán, Tamaulipas, a city and municipality in the state of Tamaulipas
Viaducto Miguel Alemán, east–west expressway in Mexico City
Lake Miguel Alemán, in Oaxaca, Mexico
Miguel Alemán Dam, on the Tonto River in Oaxaca, Mexico

Unrelated 
José Miguel Alemán (born 1956), Panamanian politician
Miguel Alemán (chess player) (1906–1979), Cuban chess player

Aleman, Miguel